Eric Green (11 Apr 1908 – 27 December 1980) was an English professional golfer. He was on the Great Britain team for the 1947 Ryder Cup but did not play in any matches. He won the Northern Professional Championship in 1947.

Golf career
In early August 1947 the P.G.A. selection committee announced a list of 14 players from which the final 10 players for 1947 Ryder Cup would be chosen. The winner of the News of the World Match Play would also be included in the list. Green was one of the 14 players in the list. Green won the Northern Professional Championship on 29 August but in early September he was not in the initial group of seven selected. Two new names were added to the list of possible players, leaving nine or ten players competing for the remaining three places. Later in September two more players were selected, which included Green, to which would be added the winner of the News of the World Matchplay.

He was assistant or professional at a number of clubs in the Liverpool area, including Liverpool Municipal, Haydock Park, Grange Park and, from 1946, professional at Huyton & Prescot Golf Club.

Tournament wins
1947 Northern Professional Championship, Leeds Cup

Results in major championships

Note: Green only played in The Open Championship.

NT = No tournament
CUT = missed the half-way cut
"T" = tied

References

English male golfers
Ryder Cup competitors for Europe
Sportspeople from Liverpool
1908 births
1980 deaths